Hoseyn Bazar may refer to:
 Hoseyn Bazar, Chabahar
 Hoseyn Bazar (25°35′ N 61°06′ E), Chabahar
 Hoseyn Bazar (25°36′ N 61°03′ E), Chabahar